A dive center is the base location where recreational divers usually learn scuba diving or make guided dive trips at new locations. Many dive centers operate under the guidelines of ISO 24803, in which case the facilities  must meet the ISO minimum standard for a service provider for recreational diving.

Shop 
Divers commonly refer to dive centers as dive shops. It is normally a shop selling diving equipment equipped with a diving air compressor to fill the cylinders. The dive center usually offers the facilities to repair and maintain scuba gear.

Diver training and guided dives 
Professional recreational diving instructors are often associated with, or employed by, a dive center. The center may be located near a swimming pool and open water, where training and guided dives can be conducted. Some operate boats or road transport and offer guided dives at recreational dive sites in the vicinity. Classrooms are often available for diver training which may include training according to ISO 24801-1 Supervised diver, ISO 24801-2 Autonomous diver and ISO 24801-3 Dive leader, and other courses according to the certification agency to which they are affiliated.

Organization 
Dive centers may be affiliated to one or more diver certification agencies to offer their beginner, advanced, professional or specialty courses.

See also
Pro shop, fulfilling similar functions in other sports
Dive centers near eco hotels

References

External links

Diving organizations
Recreational diving